Christoffer Åke Sven "Totte" Nyman (born 5 October 1992) is a Swedish professional footballer who plays for IFK Norrköping as a forward.

Club career

Youth career
Nyman was born in Norrköping and grew up close to the IFK Norrköping home stadium. He joined the youth ranks of the club at five years of age and growing up he worked at the home games both as a ball boy and with selling candy. Eventually he also joined the singing section during the games.

IFK Norrköping
Nyman moved up to play in IFK Norrköping's first team in 2010 where he featured in three games, scoring each time. His third and final goal helped secure the club's promotion to Allsvenskan. After the season, he was given the "Youth Player of the Year" award.

The following year he made his Allsvenskan debut but was also sent on loan to third tier club IF Sylvia to get more playing time.

In 2012, he had his big breakthrough at the highest Swedish level, scoring 8 goals in 29 games for Norrköping.

During the start of the 2013 Allsvenskan season Nyman struggled to perform after suffering from unknown stomach problems.

After a successful first half of the 2015 Allsvenskan Norrköping turned down two bids from FC Groningen and Osmanlıspor to buy Nyman during the summer. The club cited their ambition to win the league as the reason for keeping him and at the end of the year they did end up becoming champions for the first time in 26 years. He played a key role in their success and he was arguably their best player.

Eintracht Braunschweig
In August 2016, Nyman transferred to German 2. Bundesliga club Eintracht Braunschweig.

Return to IFK Norrköping
In January 2019, Nyman returned to IFK Norrköping having agreed a four-year contract.

International career
In 2013 Nyman was called up for the January Sweden national football team tour in Asia where he made his debut. A few months later he also played his first Sweden national under-21 football team game in a friendly against the England national under-21 football team.

On 3 September 2017, he scored his first senior goal for Sweden, in a 2018 FIFA World Cup qualifying game against Belarus, which Sweden won 4–0.

Career statistics

Club

Notes

International

 Scores and results list Sweden's goal tally first, score column indicates score after each Nyman goal.

Honours

IFK Norrköping
 Allsvenskan: 2015
 Svenska Supercupen: 2015

Individual
 Allsvenskan top scorer: 2020

References

External links
 
 IFK Norrköping profile 

1992 births
Living people
Sportspeople from Norrköping
Swedish footballers
Swedish expatriate footballers
Association football forwards
IFK Norrköping players
IF Sylvia players
Eintracht Braunschweig players
Superettan players
Allsvenskan players
2. Bundesliga players
Sweden youth international footballers
Sweden under-21 international footballers
Sweden international footballers
Expatriate footballers in Germany
Swedish expatriate sportspeople in Germany
3. Liga players
Ettan Fotboll players
Footballers from Östergötland County